Arginine/lysine, sold under the brand name LysaKare, is a fixed-dose combination medication used to protect the kidneys from radiation damage during cancer treatment with a radioactive medicine called lutetium (177Lu) oxodotreotide. It contains L-arginine hydrochloride and L-lysine hydrochloride.

The most common side effects include nausea and vomiting. Arginine/lysine is also associated with hyperkalaemia (high blood potassium levels), but the frequency of this side effect is not known. Side effects with arginine/lysine are usually mild or moderate.

Radiation from lutetium (177Lu) oxodotreotide can cause damage when the medicine passes through tubules in the kidney. Arginine and lysine interfere with the passage of lutetium (177Lu) oxodotreotide through these kidney tubules. As a result, the radioactive medicine leaves the body in the urine and the kidneys are exposed to less radiation.

Arginine/lysine was approved for medical use in the European Union in July 2019.

Medical uses 
Arginine/lysine is indicated for reduction of renal radiation exposure during peptide receptor radionuclide therapy (PRRT) with lutetium (177Lu) oxodotreotide in adults.

References

External links 
 
 

Combination drugs